Everyday Mumbai is a photoblog and collective of photographers capturing daily life in Mumbai (also known as Bombay), India.

It was started in July 2014 by photojournalist Chirag Wakaskar. The blog is using instagram as its primary platform.

Awards 
Everyday Mumbai was one of the Winner for the year 2017 in the category Citizen Media & Journalism for creating a crowd-sourced photography community by Social Media for Empowerment.

See also 

 Humans of Bombay

References

External links 

 

Indian photography websites
Mumbai
Indian blogs